Uummannaarsuk is an uninhabited island in the Sermersooq municipality in southern Greenland.

Geography
Uummannaarsuk is a 239 m high island that lies off the southeastern coast of Greenland. It is located off Cape Cort Adelaer, to the NE of Cape Daniel Rantzau, both eastern headlands of an irregularly-shaped coastal island located on the northern side of the mouth of Napasorsuaq Fjord.

See also
List of islands of Greenland

References

External links
Weather statistics for Napasorsuaq Fjord, Kujalleq (Greenland)
Kap Daniel Rantzau
Uninhabited islands of Greenland
Kujalleq